Sunset is an unincorporated community in Pickens County, South Carolina, United States. Sunset has a post office with ZIP code 29685, which opened on January 11, 1906.

References

Unincorporated communities in Pickens County, South Carolina
Unincorporated communities in South Carolina